Enrique Jardiel Poncela (15 October 1901 – 18 February 1952) was a Spanish playwright and novelist who wrote mostly humorous works.

In 1932-33 and 1934 he was called to Hollywood to help with the Spanish-language versions shot in parallel to the English-language films.

His daughter, Evangelina, wrote a book entitled, Mi padre (My Father).

Work

Novels
 Amor se escribe sin hache (1928)
 Espérame en Siberia, vida mía
 Pero... ¿hubo alguna vez once mil vírgenes? (1931)
 La tournée de Dios (1932)

Short stories compilations
 El libro del convaleciente
 Pirulís de la Habana
 Exceso de equipaje

Theatre
 El príncipe Raudhick, 1919.
 La banda de Saboya, 1922.
 Mi prima Dolly, 1923.
 ¡Te he guiñado un ojo!, 1925.
 La hoguera, 1925.
 La noche del Metro, 1925.
 ¡Achanta que te conviene!, 1925.
 El truco de Wenceslao, 1926.
 ¡Qué Colón!, 1926.
 ¡Vamos a Romea!, 1926.
 Se alquila un cuarto, 1925.
 Fernando el Santo, 1926.
 No se culpe a nadie de mi muerte, 1926.
 Una noche de primavera sin sueño (1927)
 El cadáver del señor García (1930)
 Usted tiene ojos de mujer fatal (1932)
 Angelina o el honor de un brigadier (renamed Angelina o un drama en 1880, 1934)
 Un adulterio decente (1935)
 Las cinco advertencias de Satanás (1935)
 Intimidades de Hollywood, 1935.
 La mujer y el automóvil, 1935.
 El baile, 1935.
 Morirse es un error (renamed Cuatro corazones con freno y marcha atrás, 1935)
 Cuatro corazones con freno y marcha atrás (1936)
 Carlo Monte en Monte Carlo (operetta with music by Jacinto Guerrero, 1939)
 Un marido de ida y vuelta (1939)
 Eloísa está debajo de un almendro (1940)
 Los ladrones somos gente honrada (1940)
 El amor sólo dura 2.000 metros (1941)
 Madre (el drama padre) (1941)
 Es peligroso asomarse al exterior (1942)
 Los habitantes de la casa deshabitada (1942)
 Blanca por fuera y Rosa por dentro (1943)
 Las siete vidas del gato (1943)
 A las seis en la esquina del bulevar (1943)
 Es peligroso asomarse al exterior (1945)
 Tú y yo somos tres (1945)
 El pañuelo de la dama errante (1945)
 El amor del gato y del perro (1945)
 Agua, aceite y gasolina (1946)
 El sexo débil ha hecho gimnasia (1946)
 Como mejor están las rubias es con patatas (1947)
 Los tigres escondidos en la alcoba (1949)

See also

 Café Gijón, Madrid

References

Bibliography
 Ariza Viguera, M., Enrique Jardiel Poncela en la literatura humorística española, Fragua, 1973.
 Conde Guerri, María José et al., El teatro de Enrique Jardiel Poncela, Caja de Ahorros y Monte de Piedad de Zaragoza, Aragón y Rioja, 1985.
 Conde Guerri, María José, El teatro de Enrique Jardiel Poncela: aproximación crítica, Consejo Superior de Investigaciones Científicas, Madrid, 1981.
 Congreso de Literatura Española Contemporánea (junio de 1992, Málaga), Jardiel Poncela: teatro, vanguardia y humor, actas del Sexto Congreso de Literatura Española Contemporánea, Universidad de Málaga, 10 al 13 de noviembre de 1992.
 Escudero, Carmen, Nueva aproximación a la dramaturgia de Jardiel Poncela, Editum: Ediciones de la Universidad de Murcia, 1981.
 Fernán Gómez, Fernando, El tiempo amarillo. Memorias 1943-1987, Debate, Madrid, 1990, t. II.
 Florez Diez, Rafael, Jardiel Poncela Ediciones y Publicaciones Españolas, 1969.
 François, Cécile, Personaje femenino e intertextualidad paródica en la trilogía novelesca de Enrique Jardiel Poncela, Visor Libros, 2016
 François, Cécile, Enrique Jardiel Poncela et la rénovation de l'écriture romanesque à la fin des années 20, ANRT, 2005
 Gallud Jardiel, Enrique, Enrique Jardiel Poncela: la ajetreada vida de un maestro del humor, Espasa-Calpe, 2001.
 Greco, Barbara, L'umorismo parodico di Enrique Jardiel Poncela: i romanzi, Alessandria, Edizioni dell'Orso, 2014
 Jardiel Poncela, Evangelina, Enrique Jardiel Poncela, mi padre, Biblioteca Nueva, 1999.
 Nemencia Legás, María, Margarita Ramírez de Arellano Apellániz y Susana, Eloísa está debajo de un almendro, de Enrique Jardiel Poncela, Madrid (Comunidad Autónoma), Servicio de Documentación y Publicaciones, 2004.
 Sánchez Castro, Marta: El humor en los autores de la „otra generación del 27“: Análisis lingüístico-contrastivo - Jardiel Poncela, Mihura, López Rubio y Neville. Frankfurt am Main: Peter Lang, 2007. 
 Valls, Fernando, y Roas Deus, David, Enrique Jardiel Poncela, Eneida, 2002.
 Ventín Pereira, José Augusto, Los juglares radiofónicos del siglo XX: Jardiel Poncela, Universidad Complutense de Madrid, Instituto Universitario de la Comunicación Radiofónica, 1998.
 Vida y obra de Enrique Jardiel Poncela '' Siglo Ilustrado, 1970.

External links
 
 Enrique Jardiel Poncela y las Vanguardias artísticas. El papel de la pintura en Pero... ¿hubo alguna vez once mil vírgenes? (1930) by Cécile François
 http://www.ucm.es/info/especulo/numero38/ejardiel.html De Pero...¿hubo alguna vez once mil vírgenes? a Usted tiene ojos de mujer fatal. Análisis de la adaptación teatral de una novela de Enrique Jardiel Poncela] by Cécile François
 Banditi, vendetta, debito di sangue y otros tópicos de la Córcega romántica en ¡Espérame en Siberia, vida mía! de Jardiel Poncela by Cécile François
 Los cuentos de Enrique Jardiel Poncela. Una forma literaria al servicio de la renovación del humor  by Cécile François
 Dénonciation et récupération du stéréotype dans l'œuvre romanesque de Jardiel Poncela by Cécile François
 Religión, profanación y satanismo en Pero… ¿hubo alguna vez once mil vírgenes? de Jardiel Poncela by Cécile François
 Análisis de los títulos de la trilogía novelesca de Enrique Jardiel Poncela en su dimensión ética y estética by Cécile François
 Enrique Jardiel Poncela y D.H.Lawrence. Lady Chatterley's Lover bajo la mirada burlona de un humorista español by Cécile François
 Enrique Jardiel Poncela y la novela cosmopolita de principios del siglo XX by Cécile François
 Jardiel Poncela onomaturgo. Apuntes sobre unos nombres femeninos de la trilogía humorística by Cécile François
 Enrique Jardiel Poncela y el eros negro del decadentismo francés by Cécile François
 Desmitificación del Latin Lover hollywoodiense en la trilogía novelesca de Enrique Jardiel Poncela by Cécile François
 Homenaje a Chaplin y al cine burlesco en la trilogía novelesca de Jardiel Poncela by Cécile François

1901 births
1952 deaths
Writers from Madrid
Spanish male dramatists and playwrights
Spanish humorists
20th-century Spanish dramatists and playwrights
20th-century Spanish male writers